Srasta ra Sahitya is a collection of essays by Uttam Kunwar. The book was published on 1966 by Sajha Prakashan. The essays are based on the writer's interview with thirty-five prominent Nepali writers, poets and litterateurs. 

The book won the Madan Puraskar in the same year. Kunwar worked as an editor for popular Nepali literary magazine Ruprekha and was an active literary journalist .The book's popularity and thematic variety and interest not only attracted the readers, but also gained recognition as a supporting material for various universities.

Synopsis 
Kunwar worked as an editor for popular Nepali literary magazine Ruprekha. He conducted interviews with various Nepali writers. The interviews were not in simple question and answer format but were in a conversational way between Kunwar and writers that helped the readers know the writers in a more familiar and humane manner. He wrote essays based on those interviews.

Some of the writers included in the book are:-

 Baburam Acharya, Nepalese historian
 Bhupi Sherchan, Nepalese poet
 Balkrishna Sama, Nepalese playwright
 Indra Bahadur Rai, Indian-Nepali writer
 Lekhnath Paudyal, Nepalese writer
 Kedar Man Vyathit, Nepalsese poet
 Krishna Chandra Singh Pradhan, Nepalese literary critic and essayist
 Madhav Prasad Ghimire, Nepalese poet
 M.B.B. Shah, Former king of Nepal and a poet
 Parijat, Nepalese poet and writer.
Siddhicharan Shrestha, Nepali poet

Award 
Kunwar won the prestigious Madan Puraskar for the year 2023 BS (1966) at the age of 27.

Translations and Reprint 
The book was reprinted by Uttam Kunwar Memorial Award Fund in 2013.

Various essays from the books are translated into English by Niranjan Kunwar for The Record, an independent digital publication house. 

On the occasion of the 60th anniversary celebration of Nepal-Russia diplomatic relation on September 30, 2016, Nepal Russia Literary Association, headed by Prof Dr Jangab Chauhan released a Russian translation of the book.

See also 

 Abstract Chintan Pyaj
 Hamro Lok Sanskriti
 Karnali Lok Sanskriti

References 

Nepalese non-fiction books
Nepalese non-fiction literature
Nepalese essay collections
20th-century Nepalese books
1966 non-fiction books
Madan Puraskar-winning works